Augusto Armando Polo Campos (25 February 1932 – 17 January 2018) was a Peruvian composer.

Life
Born in Puquio, Polo Campos is considered one of the best Peruvian composers of all time. He was author of many popular international hits which represent the originality and richness of Peruvian identity with their melody and lyrics.

In 1933, his family went to reside in the city of Lima. They lived in the historical Rímac District, (also the name of Lima's most famous river). From an early age Augusto discovered a love and ability to recite and compose verses and rhymes.

His home was frequently visited by artists and singers who like to dance and sing Peruvian music, all of which would eventually influence and motivate the creativity of Polo Campos, who not much later would become a prolific and successful career as an admired composer whose songs would form part of the Peruvian traditions forever.
He was in a controversy about authorship of the song "Cariño Malo", with Armando Manzanero, and APDAYC.

He never studied music and does not play any instrument, being a self-taught whose talent and intelligence has helped him to create many beautiful songs making him able to obtain a Guinness Record for been able to make a song in less than 2 minutes.  One of his songs was included in the James Bond film Quantum of Solace.

He had 7 children, Carmen, Augusto, Selena,Marco,Giomar, Flor and a Cristovals 

His vals "Regresa" was a number one hit internationally for Peruvian singer Lucha Reyes, and again in an instrumental form for Peruvian electronic band Madre Matilda. "Regresa" was also the title track of an album by Los Violines de Lima in 1970.

Songs
 Cariño Bonito
 Regresa
 De la victoria a la Gloria Alianza Lima
 Esta es mi tierra
 La Jarana de Colón
 Romance en la Parada
 Cariño Malo
 Cada Domingo a las doce, después de la Misa 
 Regresa
 Vuelve pronto
 Si Lima pudiera Hablar
 Y se llama... Perú
 Cuando Llora mi Guitarra
 Contigo Perú
 Tu Perdición
 Morena, la Flor de Lima
 Limeña
 Hombre con H
 Ay Raquel

Discography
Pamela, Latin ( Bolero ) Peru

References

External links
 
 Romance en la Parada, Vals
 Juan Cruz Castiñeiras entrevista al compositor peruano Augusto Polo Campos

1932 births
2018 deaths
People from Ayacucho Region
Peruvian male composers
Peruvian songwriters
Male songwriters